Schmalkalden is a town in the Schmalkalden-Meiningen district, in the southwest of the state of Thuringia, Germany. It is on the southern slope of the Thuringian Forest at the Schmalkalde river, a tributary to the Werra. , the town had a population of 19,978.

History 
First mentioned in an 874 deed, Smalcalta in the Frankish duchy of Thuringia received town privileges about 1180. When Landgrave Henry Raspe of Thuringia died without issue in 1247, it passed to the House of Henneberg-Schleusingen, while the major part of the landgraviate fell to the House of Wettin in Meissen. To secure their acquisition the Counts of Henneberg allied with the Landgraviate of Hesse, including the conclusion of an inheritance treaty. In 1360, together with Landgrave Henry II of Hesse they paid off Frederick V, Burgrave of Nuremberg, son of Elisabeth of Henneberg.

In 1531 the town hall of Schmalkalden was the site of the establishment of the Schmalkaldic League by Protestant princes under the lead of Landgrave Philip I of Hesse, in order to protect religious and political interests within their domains. In 1537 the Smalcald Articles were drawn up by Martin Luther, Philipp Melanchthon and other reformers.

When the Counts of Henneberg became extinct in 1583, their share was inherited by William IV, Landgrave of Hesse-Kassel. William made the town a residence and had Wilhelmsburg Castle erected, finished in 1590. The Lordship of Schmalkalden remained an exclave of Hesse, from 1868 on it was part of the Prussian province of Hesse-Nassau until it was incorporated into the Province of Saxony in 1944 and in 1945 became part of the State of Thuringia.

The town sustained heavy bomb damage in World War II. From 1949 on, with Thuringia, it formed part of East Germany. After reunification it attained its present political configuration. In July 2018 the former municipality of Springstille was merged into Schmalkalden.

Notable people 
Christoph Cellarius, scholar, born 22 November 1638, died 4 June 1707 in Halle
Christian Karl August Ludwig von Massenbach, colonel, born 16 April 1758, died 21 November 1827 at Białokosz
Karl Wilhelm, choral director, born 5 September 1815, died 26 August 1873 in Schmalkalden
Otto H. Schade, television pioneer, born 27 April 1903, died 28 April 1981 in West Caldwell, New Jersey
Angela Steinmüller, mathematician and science fiction author, born 1941
Frank Luck, biathlete, born 5 December 1967
Sven Fischer, biathlete, born 16 April 1971
Steffi Jacob, skeleton racer, born 30 September 1975
Kati Wilhelm, biathlete, born 2 August 1976
Alexander Wolf, biathlete, born 21 December 1978

International relations

Schmalkalden is twinned with:
  Fontaine, Isère, France
  Recklinghausen, Germany

Notes

References 
 

 
1583 disestablishments
States and territories established in 1247
Schmalkalden-Meiningen